Stan Mercer (11 September 1919 – 2003) was an English professional footballer who played in the Football League for Accrington Stanley, Leicester City and Mansfield Town where he also had a spell as manager.

References

1919 births
2003 deaths
English footballers
Association football forwards
English Football League players
Blackpool F.C. players
Mansfield Town F.C. players
Leicester City F.C. players
Accrington Stanley F.C. (1891) players
Mansfield Town F.C. managers
English football managers